John Alexander McGlinn III (September 18, 1953 – February 14, 2009) was an American conductor and musical theatre archivist. He was one of the principal proponents of authentic studio cast recordings of Broadway musicals, using original orchestrations and vocal arrangements.

Biography
John Alexander McGlinn III was born in Bryn Mawr, Pennsylvania, and was raised in Gladwyne, Pennsylvania. A self-taught pianist, he studied music theory and composition at Northwestern University, graduating in 1976.

His first recording, 1984's Songs of New York for the Book of the Month Club was not his first experience as a conductor. He had previously conducted Hey Feller! and Misery's Come Round, using Karla Burns and members of the Houston Grand Opera production of Show Boat, for one of the "Jerome Kern Revisiteds" for Ben Bagley's Painted Smiles Records. He had previously worked for the New York City Opera and planned a book on Jerome Kern. McGlinn's interest in Kern emerged at the same time as a 1970s' revival of interest in authentic American music, including a Scott Joplin revival and Gunther Schuller's ragtime performances. In the early 1980s he joined with the Houston Grand Opera to work on a major revival of Kern and Oscar Hammerstein II's Show Boat, acting as musical editor and restoring the original orchestrations for the production. He also did some work for Ira Gershwin on original orchestrations for several Gershwin projects and worked with veteran orchestrator Hans Spialek on the 1983 Broadway revival of On Your Toes. Following the Book of the Month Club recording, McGlinn performed three Kern musicals in concert at the Carnegie Recital Hall and this success led to a recording contract with EMI-Angel Records. The first recordings were an album of George Gershwin songs with Dame Kiri Te Kanawa and a program of Gershwin overtures.

From 1987 to 1992 he made recordings of the complete scores for Show Boat, Anything Goes, Brigadoon, Annie Get Your Gun, Kiss Me, Kate, and an obscure Jerome Kern musical, Sitting Pretty.

The three-disc, three-and-a-half hour Show Boat album was highly acclaimed, and the one-disc Anything Goes album, was acclaimed by some, but panned by others. The New Yorker magazine called McGlinn's Show Boat "the show album of the past" and "a show album for the future.
It unites the possibilities of reproduction and reinvestigation." McGlinn unearthed the lost materials for Show Boat in a Secaucus, New Jersey, warehouse in 1982.

In 1992 EMI chose not to renew his contract. During this period he conducted many performances of musicals in concert, including the original 1925 No, No, Nanette (at the Carnegie Recital Hall), and the Kern-Hammerstein show Sunny. He made several radio appearances with the BBC Symphony Orchestra for BBC Radio 3, conducted several concerts in conjunction with the Library of Congress Music Division, and was guest conductor on an "Evening With The Boston Pops" telecast. He returned to the recording studio to make two albums of excerpts from Wagner operas for Naxos Records. At the New York City Opera he conducted revivals of Brigadoon and H.M.S. Pinafore and, in 1993, at Juilliard School of Music, he conducted the Poulenc one-act operas La Voix Humaine and Les Mamelles de Tiresias.

Another project, begun in early 2001, was to record and edit for The Packard Humanities Institute scholarly editions of Victor Herbert and Jerome Kern musicals, but none of these albums has been released. McGlinn left the project in 2002 and the future of the recordings remains in limbo.

His last project was to edit a new edition of the 1954 Broadway version of Peter Pan for Samuel French.

McGlinn was found dead in his New York City apartment on February 14, 2009, of a heart attack.

Discography
 Irving Berlin: "Annie Get Your Gun", EMI Records 54206 (1991)
 George Gershwin: "Kiri Sings Gershwin", EMI Records 47454 (1987)
 George Gershwin: Gershwin Overtures, EMI Records 47977, 1987
 Jerome Kern: Show Boat, EMI Records 49108, 1988
 Jerome Kern: Jerome Kern Treasury, EMI Records 54883, 1993
 Jerome Kern: Overtures and Music from the film "Swing Time", EMI 49630, 1989
 Jerome Kern: Sitting Pretty, New World Records, 80387, 1990
 Frederick Loewe/Alan Jay Lerner: "Brigadoon", EMI Records 54481 (1992)
 Cole Porter: Anything Goes, EMI Records 894424, 1989
 Cole Porter: "Kiss Me, Kate" EMI 54033 (1990)
 Cole Porter: Night and Day: Thomas Hampson sings Cole Porter, EMI Records 54203, 1991
 Cole Porter: "Overtures and Ballet Music", EMI Records 54300 (1991)
 Richard Rodgers: My Funny Valentine: Frederica von Stade sings Rodgers and Hart, EMI Records 54071, 1990
 Harry Warren/Al Dubin: "The Busby Berkeley Album" EMI Records 55189 (1994)
 Kurt Weill: Kurt Weill on Broadway, EMI Records 55563, 1996 
 Various: The Lorelei, Kim Criswell, EMI 54802, 1993
 Various: "Broadway Showstoppers", EMI Records 54586 (1992)
 Various: "Songs of New York", Book of the Month Club Records 41-7005 (1984)

References

External links

1953 births
2009 deaths
American male conductors (music)
American music historians
People from Bryn Mawr, Pennsylvania
20th-century American historians
American male non-fiction writers
Historians from Pennsylvania
Classical musicians from Pennsylvania
20th-century American conductors (music)
20th-century American male musicians
20th-century American male writers